The Fourth of June is the first novel by David Benedictus.

The novel was considered controversial when published in 1962 as it describes scenes of violent bullying at Eton College, unrestrained class warfare and suggestions of schoolboy sexuality. It has some parallels with Tom Brown's School Days. It was adapted into a drama, produced in London in 1964 at the St Martin's Theatre.

References

1962 British novels
Eton College
Novels set in Berkshire
1962 debut novels
Novels by David Benedictus
Anthony Blond books